Veselin Stoykov (born 27 August 1986) is a Bulgarian footballer, who plays as a striker for Strumska Slava.

Club statistics
As of 1 August 2011

References

1986 births
Living people
Bulgarian footballers
OFC Pirin Blagoevgrad players
PFC Pirin Blagoevgrad players
PFC Vidima-Rakovski Sevlievo players
FC Caspiy players
FC Septemvri Simitli players
First Professional Football League (Bulgaria) players
Second Professional Football League (Bulgaria) players

Association football forwards
Sportspeople from Blagoevgrad